Lafayette Square Historic District is a historic district roughly bounded by Hickory and 18th Sts., Jefferson and Lafayette Aves. in St. Louis, Missouri.  Buildings in the district include a department store, a single dwelling, a public park, and a specialty store.  The district was added to the National Register of Historic Places in 1972.  A boundary increase in 1986 added an area roughly bounded by Chouteau Ave., Dolman, Lafayette Ave., and S. Eighteenth St. and Vail Pl. and MacKay Pl.  Buildings in the boundary increase include single and multiple dwellings, a manufacturing facility and a specialty store.

See also
Lafayette Square, St. Louis
National Register of Historic Places listings in St. Louis south and west of downtown

References

Second Empire architecture in Missouri
Italianate architecture in Missouri
Geography of St. Louis
Historic districts on the National Register of Historic Places in Missouri
National Register of Historic Places in St. Louis
1972 establishments in Missouri